Raymond Edward Alan Christopher Paley (7 January 1907 – 7 April 1933) was an English mathematician who made significant contributions to mathematical analysis before dying young in a skiing accident.

Life
Paley was born in Bournemouth, England, the son of an artillery officer who died of tuberculosis before Paley was born. He was educated at Eton College as a King's Scholar and at Trinity College, Cambridge. He became a wrangler in 1928, and with J. A. Todd, he was one of two winners of the 1930 Smith's Prize examination.

He was elected a Research Fellow of Trinity College in 1930, edging out Todd for the position, and continued at Cambridge as a postgraduate student, advised by John Edensor Littlewood. After the 1931 return of G. H. Hardy to Cambridge he participated in weekly joint seminars with the other students of Hardy and Littlewood. He traveled to the US in 1932 to work with Norbert Wiener at the Massachusetts Institute of Technology and with George Pólya at Princeton University, and as part of the same trip also planned to work with Lipót Fejér at a seminar in Chicago organized as part of the Century of Progress exposition.

He was killed on 7 April 1933 in a skiing trip to the Canadian Rockies, by an avalanche on Deception Pass.

Contributions
Paley's contributions include the following.
His mathematical research with Littlewood began in 1929, with his work towards a fellowship at Trinity, and Hardy writes that "Littlewood's influence dominates nearty all his earliest work". Their work became the foundation for Littlewood–Paley theory, an application of real-variable techniques in complex analysis. 
The Walsh–Paley numeration, a standard method for indexing the Walsh functions, came from a 1932 suggestion of Paley.
Paley collaborated with Antoni Zygmund on Fourier series, continuing the work on this topic that he had already done with Littlewood. His work in this area also led to the Paley–Zygmund inequality in probability theory.
In a 1933 paper, he published the Paley construction for Hadamard matrices. In the same paper, he first formulated the Hadamard conjecture on the sizes of matrices for which Hadamard matrices exist. The Paley graphs and Paley tournaments in graph theory are closely related, although they do not appear explicitly in this work. In the context of compressed sensing, frames (partial bases of Hilbert spaces) derived from this construction have been called "Paley equiangular tight frames".
His collaboration with Norbert Wiener included the Paley–Wiener theorem in harmonic analysis. Paley was originally selected as the 1934 American Mathematical Society Colloquium Lecturer; after his death, Wiener replaced him as speaker, and spoke on their joint work, which was published as a book.

Selected publications
For the short span of his research career, Paley was very productive; Hardy lists 26 of Paley's publications, and more were published posthumously. These publications include:

References

1907 births
1933 deaths
Scientists from Bournemouth
20th-century English mathematicians
Graph theorists
Mathematical analysts
People educated at Eton College
Alumni of Trinity College, Cambridge
Fellows of Trinity College, Cambridge
Natural disaster deaths in Canada
Deaths in avalanches